Trones is a village in the municipality of Namsskogan in Trøndelag county, Norway. Trones Church is located in Trones, and it is the main church for the area. European route E6 highway and the Nordlandsbanen railway line both pass through the village.

References

Villages in Trøndelag
Namsskogan